Daniel Patrick Moriarty (18 August 1875 – 26 August 1903) was an Australian rules footballer who played with Fitzroy and Melbourne in the Victorian Football League (VFL).

Moriarty was killed by a freight train near Jolimont railway station in August 1903, eight days after his 28th birthday. The coroner's inquest determined that he probably died while having an epileptic seizure.

Sources

External links

Demon Wiki profile

Australian rules footballers from Melbourne
Fitzroy Football Club players
Melbourne Football Club players
Railway accident deaths in Australia
Accidental deaths in Victoria (Australia)
1875 births
1903 deaths